Sha Po is a village located in the area of Yung Shue Wan on the North side of Lamma Island, the third largest island in the territory of Hong Kong.

It comprises Sha Po Old Village and Sha Po New Village.

Administration
Sha Po is a recognized village under the New Territories Small House Policy.

Archaeological interest
Sha Po Old Village is a place of archaeological interest. A complete hard geometric pot was unearthed in Sha Po Old Village by the Hong Kong Archaeological Society in 1970. In 1988, Bronze Age hard geometric was found by the same party in basel layers near water table, underlying 2m of kiln debris and clean sand.

Education
All of Lamma Island is in Primary One Admission (POA) School Net 96. Within the school net is one aided school (operated independently but funded with government money): Northern Lamma School (南丫北段公立小學). No government schools are in the net.

References

Further reading

External links

 Delineation of area of existing village Sha Po (Lamma North) for election of resident representative (2019 to 2022)

Villages in Islands District, Hong Kong
Lamma Island